Valeri Belyakov (born 13 April 1953) was a field hockey player from the Soviet Union whose team won the bronze medal at the 1980 Summer Olympics in Moscow, behind India (gold) and Spain.

References

External links
 

1953 births
Living people
Russian male field hockey players
Olympic field hockey players of the Soviet Union
Soviet male field hockey players
Field hockey players at the 1980 Summer Olympics
Olympic bronze medalists for the Soviet Union
Olympic medalists in field hockey
Medalists at the 1980 Summer Olympics